Goggia hexapora, also known as the Cedarberg dwarf leaf-toed gecko  or Cedarberg pygmy gecko,  is a species of gecko. It is found in South Africa.

References

Goggia
Reptiles described in 1995
Taxa named by William Roy Branch